Alexander Hezzel (born 12 August 1964) is a Venezuelan footballer. He played in six matches for the Venezuela national football team from 1994 to 1996. He was also part of Venezuela's squad for the 1995 Copa América tournament.

References

External links
 

1964 births
Living people
Venezuelan footballers
Venezuela international footballers
Place of birth missing (living people)
Association football defenders
Caracas FC players